The Erskine Inlet is a natural waterway through the central Canadian Arctic Archipelago in Canada. It separates Cameron Island, Île Vanier, Massey Island and Alexander Island (to the west) from Bathurst Island (to the south and east).

References 

Inlets of Qikiqtaaluk Region